Saint Vincent and the Grenadines competed at the 1996 Summer Olympics in Atlanta, United States with eight track and field athletes.

Athletics

Men

Women

Key
Note–Ranks given for track events are within the athlete's heat only
Q = Qualified for the next round
q = Qualified for the next round as a fastest loser or, in field events, by position without achieving the qualifying target
NR = National record
N/A = Round not applicable for the event
Bye = Athlete not required to compete in round

See also
Saint Vincent and the Grenadines at the 1994 Commonwealth Games
Saint Vincent and the Grenadines at the 1995 Pan American Games
Saint Vincent and the Grenadines at the 1998 Commonwealth Games

References
Official Olympic Reports
 sports-reference

Nations at the 1996 Summer Olympics
1996
1996 in Saint Vincent and the Grenadines